Philip Timothy Howard (born March 7, 1961) is a Florida attorney who was disbarred by the Florida Supreme Court by Order issued March 24, 2022, accepting the Referee’s Report that found Howard had committed nine of the ten violations of the Code of Professional Responsibility charged against Howard by The Florida Bar.

He is the former director of the College of Professional Studies' Doctorate Program in Law & Policy at Northeastern University.  He is a former assistant attorney general of Florida and nominee for United States Attorney for the Northern District of Florida. Howard also had a private law practice, Howard & Associates, P.A., which was permanently closed by order of the Florida Supreme Court in its March 24, 2022, order of disbarment.

Education
In 2005 Howard received his Ph.D. from Northeastern University in law, policy & society after defending his thesis "We've Been Framed!: Progressive Cause Lawyer Leadership in Florida Tobacco Liability Litigation."  He received his Juris Doctor from Florida State University in 1986 and was admitted to the bar in 1987.  He received his Bachelor of Arts, Cum Laude, in Government, with minors in history, law & society, and Spanish, from Florida State University in 1983.   He is a former health law scholar and instructor in constitutional law, civil liberties, judicial process, and media & politics at Boston University.

Litigation

Benzene
Howard was part of the national counsel in five states and the District of Columbia, attempting to remove ingredients that could possibly form benzene under heat exposure from soft drinks.  Coca-Cola, Kraft Foods, PepsiCo, and Sunny Delight Beverages Co., among others, agreed to remove the benzene-causing ingredients and provide refunds and replacements to consumers.

Florida tobacco litigation
Howard was one of the five original creators of Florida's Medicaid Third Party Liability Law, that created the foundation for the largest civil case settlement in the nation's history.

Academic Articles
Howard has published several articles on cause lawyers, culture, and social movements, and has made annual presentations before the Law & Society Association.  His most recent article, "Cause Lawyers at the Constructive Edge: 'A Band of Brothers Defeats Big Tobacco'" was included in The Cultural Lives of Cause Lawyers, a book published by Cambridge University Press in early 2008.

Academic career
From 2005 to 2006 he was a Visiting Scholar & Instructor at Boston University School of Law and Public Health. From 2006 to 2012 he was a professor and later Director of the Doctorate Program in Law & Policy at Northeastern University.

Since 2011 he has served as the President of Cambridge Graduate University International in Florida and Massachusetts.

Indictment 
In December 2022 Howard was indicted by a federal grand jury on one count of racketeering for allegedly engaging in wire fraud and money laundering in relation to both his investment companies and law firm.

References

Florida lawyers
Living people
Florida State University alumni
Florida State University College of Law alumni
People from Tallahassee, Florida
1961 births
Northeastern University alumni
People charged with racketeering